Donald Mackintosh (16 May 1840 – 5 May 1932) was a farmer and member of the Queensland Legislative Assembly.

Early days
Mackintosh was born in Lochaber, Scotland, to parents James Mackintosh and his wife Mary (née Macarthur) and was educated in the local Lochaber village school. On his arrival in Australia he was a drover and the manager of the Glencoe Farm near Warwick.

Political career
Having been a member of the Jondaryan Divisional Board, Mackintosh, for the Ministerialists, represented the seat of Cambooya in the Queensland Legislative Assembly from 1899 until the seat was abolished in 1912. He then moved to the new seat of Pittsworth and held the seat until he was defeated in 1915.

Personal life
In 1866, Mackintosh married Catherine Cowley (died 1907) and together had five sons and three daughters.

He died in Toowoomba in 1932 and was buried in Drayton and Toowoomba Cemetery.

References

Members of the Queensland Legislative Assembly
1840 births
1932 deaths